Changhua is a railway station in Changhua City, Changhua County, Taiwan served by Taiwan Railways. It is located at the southern junction of the Taichung line and Coastal line, where the line continues onto the southern section of the West Coast line.

Overview

The station has two island platforms and one side platform. Currently, there is an overpass at the south side of the station to access the back station platforms. A cross-platform station is currently under construction on the north side.

History
26 March 1905: The station opened as Changhua-eki (彰化驛).
1918: The second-generation station was completed.
1922: The fan-shaped depot was constructed, as well as an overpass for the station.
10 December 1958: Construction on the current station is completed.
15 June 1959: The current station begins service. Also, a restaurant in the station was built (it has since ceased operating).
19 January 2004: The fan-shaped depot is designated as a historical site.
27 May 2005: Renovation on the fan-shaped depot is completed.
25 February 2008: In order to increase service, the Taroko Express begins stopping at the station.

Platform layout

Around the station
 Changhua Arts Hall
 Changhua City Library
 Changhua County Art Museum
 Changhua County Council
 Changhua County Government
 Changhua Girls' Senior High School
 Changhua Roundhouse
 Changhua Wude Hall
 Chienkuo Technology University
 Kaihua Temple
 National Changhua University of Education
 Yuanching Temple
 Changhua City Office
 Taiwan Theater
 Changhua Theater
 Changhua County Police Department
 Changhua bus transfer stations

See also
 List of railway stations in Taiwan

References

External links

Changhua Station (Chinese)
Changhua Station (English)

1905 establishments in Taiwan
Changhua City
Railway stations in Changhua County
Railway stations opened in 1905
Railway stations served by Taiwan Railways Administration